Ciocănari may refer to several villages in Romania:

 Ciocănari, a village in Niculești Commune, Dâmbovița County
 Ciocănari, a village in Măciuca Commune, Vâlcea County